Juš Milčinski is a Slovenian improviser best known for his role in reorganization and revitalization of Impro League in 2005. He is executive producer at international Naked Stage festival of improvisational theatre, and a member of IGLU Theatre team.

References

External links
 Interview with Juš Milčinski about Wabi-sabi-themed Seattle International Festival of Improv 2012
 Interview with Juš Milčinski (in Slovene), 11 December 2013, Apparatus.si, a Slovenian podcast platform

Theatre people from Ljubljana
University of Ljubljana alumni
Slovenian male stage actors
Year of birth missing (living people)
Living people
21st-century Slovenian male actors